"Long Black Limousine" is a song written by Vern Stovall and Bobby George around 1958. The first released version was Stovall's, in 1961.

Background
Stovall and George, country musicians based in southern California, had Wynn Stewart first record their song in 1958, but this recording was not released until many years later.

Cover Versions
Many other artists have covered the song, including:
in 1964, Bobby Bare covered the song and included it on his album The Travelin' Bare.
Glen Campbell recorded the song in 1962, and included it on his album Big Bluegrass Special.
Merle Haggard included it on his 1967 album Branded Man.
In 1968, Jody Miller recorded the only charting single of the song, reaching number 73 on the US country chart. This version was included on her 1968 album The Nashville Sound of Jody Miller. 
O. C. Smith's version was released as the B-side of his million-selling crossover hit "Little Green Apples" in 1968. 
Elvis Presley's version appeared on his 1969 From Elvis in Memphis album, and is the best-known recording of the song.
Jeannie Seely (1968)
Connie Smith (1969)
The Flying Burrito Brothers (1969)
The Grateful Dead (1969)
Doug Jernigan (1970)
Rattlesnake Annie (1981)
Carl Rutherford (2001), 
Barb Jungr (2005).

References

 

Elvis Presley songs
Glen Campbell songs
Jody Miller songs
1961 songs